This is a list of ecoregions of Pakistan.

References

 
Pakistan
Ecoregions